Paddy, Not Patty is a grassroots movement to correct and standardize the American use of Paddy instead of Patty when celebrating St. Patrick's Day. While people in the know have been casually correcting the casual exchange between patty/paddy on the spot, the movement to educate the public at large was solidified with the website Paddynotpatty.com.

Origins 
The domain for PaddynotPaddy.com was initially registered in 2010  by Marcus Campbell. Since then, the single-page site has maintained a single premise: It's Paddy, Not Patty. Ever.The website further explains: Paddy is derived from the Irish, Pádraig: the source of those mysterious, emerald double-Ds.

Patty is the diminutive of Patricia, or a burger, and just not something you call a fella.

There isn’t a sinner in Ireland that would refer to a Patrick as “Patty”. It’s as simple as that.

Widespread Implementation 
More recently, the debate is further settled by sources such as Merriam-Webster. In a dedicated Words At Play article, they establish: Patrick is the Anglicized form of Pádraig, nicknamed Páidín and Paddy.As of 2022, USA today covered the story and referenced Campbell's site.

CNN's Amy Croffey, a reporter based out of London and Galloway, wrote: "On the Emerald Isle, we say St. Patty’s about as much as we utter “top O’ the mornin to ye” while eating corned beef and cabbage alongside a leprechaun minding a pot of gold and wearing a four-leaf clover in our lapel – i.e., absolutely never."

Additionally, Irish-born reporter Donie O'Sullivan is quoted as saying: “I poke fun at my friends here who might call it St. Patty’s Day, but it’s not a big deal,” O’Sullivan said.

Other Variations 
Campbell also outlines on PaddynotPatty.com other acceptable phrasings, such as:

 Paddy
 Pat
 Packie
 Podge
 Pád
 Pod

But further emphasizes that "Patty" is a daft term.

However, Merriam-Webster also points out how some find the phrasing "St. Paddy's Day" inappropriate as the word Paddy has long since been a disparaging name for an Irishman. In 18th century informal British English, paddy refers to "a fit of temper."

References 

Language
Holidays